Fatima Lodhi (born 29 September 1989) is a social activist; who is also known as the "Champion of Diversity" because of the step that she has taken by launching 'Dark is Divine', the first anti-colorism campaign from Pakistan.
She has been awarded the Woman of Excellence & Young Woman Leadership Award. Fatima Lodhi is the first Pakistani who has taken a stand against "colorism".

Early life and education
Lodhi is the granddaughter of a former All India Cricketer and Karachi selector, Abbas Khan Lodhi. She was born in Karachi and brought up in Islamabad.

She received her early education from St. Patrick's School, in Karachi, completed her high school from The City School and her bachelor's degree in International Relations from (SZABIST) in Islamabad. Lodhi has also completed several certificate courses from United States Institute of Peace and National Association of Social Workers.

Activism
Lodhi entered the world of Activism in 2008 and continued advocating for the rights and inclusion of persons with disabilities. She has been facilitating training on the topics of "Inclusive Disaster Risk Reduction", "Disability Equality", "Community Based Inclusive Rehabilitation", "Sign Language" and "Inclusive Education" along with the "Active Citizens" workshops by British Council and "Junior Leaders Conference" by We Can End Violence Against Women. In 2011 her Rotaract journey started, and since then she has served at different positions in her club as well as in the Rotaract district. She is a dedicated volunteer, who has volunteered for different local and international Non Profit Organizations and has raised her voice for the rights of the Acid Burn Victims, against HIV/AIDS, SRHR and violence against women.

Since childhood, she has been speaking against "colorism" and in 2013, she launched 'Dark is Divine' a proper anti-colorism campaign, with an aim of redefining the society's unrealistic standards of beauty.

Lodhi is the youngest rising anti-colorism and diversity advocate from Asia. She conducts awareness and training sessions on the topic of diversity, self-acceptance and positive body image.

Talks
Lodhi is a motivational speaker and has spoken at different national and international public forums.

She delivered a talk at TEDx in 2014 & moderated a panel discussion at the "International Women Empowerment Conference" in 2015.

She was invited at a "Women Awareness Seminar" to deliver a lecture on colorism.

Invited as a guest speaker by PTV WORLD (Worldwide TV channel) on World Day of Acceptance.

Invited as a guest by FM-100, a national Radio channel to speak about colorism.

Was invited by a national TV channel to have a discussion on color discrimination.

Recognition, interviews and articles

Lodhi has been interviewed by and featured in different newspapers and magazines across the globe in appreciation and for propagation of her work under “Dark is Divine”. She was also one of the nominees for the 50 Powerful Women in The News.

Interviewed by The Rotarian Magazine,

Interviewed by BBC.

Woman of the Week by a UK-based radio and was exclusively interviewed by Afghan Voice Radio.

Interviewed by UAE’s entrepreneur.

Women’s Voices Now.

"Brown Girl Magazine" featured “Fatima Lodhi’s” story of fighting Colorism.

Was featured in THE NEWS.

Was featured in Dawn Newspaper.

Article published in Lanka's newspaper The Nation. 

Article published on Afghan Voice Radio’s website.

Interviewed by Hindustan Times.
     
Interviewed by Women’s Own Magazine.            

Article Published on India’s online news portal Punjab Khabar.

Article published on NRI News India.

Interviewed by Khabarfeed.

References

Pakistani women's rights activists
Living people
Pakistani social workers
People from Karachi
People from Islamabad
1989 births